The American Heart Association (AHA) Paul "Bear" Bryant Awards are an annual awards banquet that is hosted each year in January, in Houston, Texas, by the AHA. There are two awards. One of them—the Paul "Bear" Bryant Coach of the Year Award—has been given annually since 1986 to NCAA college football's national coach of the year. The Award was named in honor of longtime Alabama coach Bear Bryant after he died of a heart attack in 1983. It is voted on by the National Sports Media Association (formerly the National Sportscasters and Sportswriters Association) and proceeds from the awards ceremony benefit the Houston chapter of the American Heart Association, which is the organizing sponsor—since 1986, at the request of the Bryant family—and which obtains a "presenting sponsor" (currently Marathon Oil Corporation). The College Football Coach of the Year Award began in 1957 and was renamed for Bryant in 1986. Bryant himself won the AFCA Coach of the Year award in 1961, 1971, and 1973.

According to the official website:
The Paul "Bear" Bryant College Football Coaching Awards is an exclusive event that honors a college football coach whose great accomplishments, both on and off the field, are legendary.  The award recognizes the masters of coaching and allows them to take their deserved place in history beside other legends like Bear Bryant. 

Unlike many college football head coaching awards, it is presented after each season's bowl games.

In 2000, the AHA began presenting a second award, the Paul "Bear" Bryant Lifetime Achievement Award.

Winners
Note: The year indicates the season for which the award was presented. The award is presented in January of the following year.

Lifetime Achievement Award winners 
See footnote.

2000 – Darrell Royal
2001 – Charles McClendon
2002 – Bill Yeoman
2003 – Frank Broyles
2004 – Gene Stallings
2005 – Lou Holtz
2006 – Jack Pardee
2007 – Bo Schembechler
2008 – Tom Osborne
2009 – Barry Switzer
2010 – Vince Dooley
2011 – Bobby Bowden
2012 – Hayden Fry
2013 – LaVell Edwards
2014 – R. C. Slocum
2015 – Jimmy Johnson
2016 – Mack Brown
2017 – Barry Alvarez
2018 – Steve Spurrier
2019 – Frank Beamer
2020 – Bill Snyder
2021 – Howard Schnellenberger
2022 - John Robinson
2023 - Bob Stoops

See also 
AFCA Coach of the Year
Associated Press College Football Coach of the Year Award
Walter Camp Coach of the Year
Bobby Dodd Coach of the Year Award
The Home Depot Coach of the Year Award
Sporting News College Football Coach of the Year

References

External links
Paul "Bear" Bryant College Football Coaching Awards

College football coach of the year awards in the United States
Lifetime achievement awards
Awards established in 1957